Hugo Miguel Figueira Viveiros (born 25 September 1995) is a Portuguese footballer who plays for SC Ideal as a goalkeeper.

Football career
On 28 April 2014, Viveiros made his professional debut with Santa Clara in a 2013–14 Segunda Liga match against Moreirense.

References

External links

Stats and profile at LPFP 

Hugo Viveiros at ZeroZero

1995 births
People from Ponta Delgada
Living people
Portuguese footballers
Association football goalkeepers
C.D. Santa Clara players
U.D. Vilafranquense players
CD Operário players
Liga Portugal 2 players